Jumiles;, are small stink bugs native to the Taxco region of the state of Guerrero in Mexico. Their diet includes the leaves of the encina (Quercus ilex) tree. Chumiles are a smaller, similar stink bug of the same region (southern Morelos and northern Guerrero). Any edible Hemiptera from the families Coreidae or Pentatomidae may be considered jumiles as well.

Use as food 
Jumiles are collected for their culinary value and may be roasted, fried, ground, or eaten raw. A salsa is prepared by combining fresh tomatoes, chiles and onions with jumiles that have been mashed in a molcajete. The salsa is served with corn tortillas. The beginning of the jumil season on November 1 is the occasion of a large fiesta in Taxco. Fiesta-goers gather in the mountain park of Huisteco to collect jumiles and to crown a Jumil Queen. Jumiles are plentiful from November until February and become scarce after the first rains.

Jumiles have a cinnamon-like odor. They are considered an acquired taste due to their high iodine content, which imparts a bitter, medicinal flavor. Jumiles are also a good source of tryptophan and the vitamins riboflavin and niacin.

References

Further reading

External links 
 Video of Mexican Celebrity Edgarito eating a live Jumil
 Story and photos of jumiles and salsa made from jumiles

Edible insects
Mexican cuisine
Pentatomidae
Pentatomomorpha
Insects of Mexico